Warwick Saint (born 9 January 1972 in South Africa) is a New York-based photographer who specializes in fashion, celebrity, and advertising images.

Career
Warwick Saint is most famous for his portraits of A-list celebrities including Drew Barrymore, Jared Leto, Cate Blanchett, Beyoncé, Charlize Theron, Christina Aguilera, and P.Diddy. He has worked for magazines including Rolling Stone, Interview Magazine, Flaunt, BlackBook Magazine, Dazed and Confused magazine, Numéro, Harpers Bazaar, Vanity Fair, and the Sports Illustrated Swimsuit Issue. He has shot campaigns for brands including Puma, Nike, Costume National, and Diesel.

Saint is a recipient of the Hasselblad Masters Award.

References

External links
 Warwick Saint – Official Website
 Hasselblad Masters Profile
 Online Gallery presenting Saint´s works 

Photographers from New York (state)
Living people
1972 births